Cromna is a genus of fulgoroid planthoppers in the family Flatidae. It was described by Francis Walker in 1857.

Species 
FLOW include the following, with records from Indochina and northern Borneo:
 Cromna acutipennis (Walker, 1857) - type species
 Cromna albopunctata (Kirby, 1891)
 Cromna andamanensis (Distant, 1906)
 Cromna sinensis (Walker, 1851)

 Species brought to synonymy
 Phyllyphanta albidosparsa Distant, 1910
 Cromna angulifera, synonym of Phyllyphanta angulifera
 Cromna aspera, synonym of Colgar asperum
 Cromna centralis, synonym of Neomelicharia sparsa
 Cromna chlorospila, synonym of Taparella doryca
 Cromna elegans, synonym of Siphanta acuta
 Cromna farinosa, synonym of Colgar farinosa
 Cromna frontalis, synonym of Colgaroides acuminata
 Cromna nasalis, synonym of Euphanta munda
 Cromna notata, synonym of Colgar notata
 Cromna obtusa, synonym of Colgar albescens
 Cromna peracuta, synonym of Parasalurnis roseicincta
 Cromna quadripunctata, synonym of Euphanta quadripunctata
 Cromna surrecta, synonym for Colgar surrectum

References

External links 

 Cromna at Insectoid.info

Flatidae
Auchenorrhyncha genera